Oh Me Oh My (full title Oh Me Oh My...The Way the Day Goes By the Sun Is Setting Dogs Are Dreaming Lovesongs of the Christmas Spirit) is the second album by Devendra Banhart. Its name was taken from the lyrics of one of Banhart's earliest songs, "Sunrise (A Long Time Ago)".  It was the first release by Devendra on Young God Records and it came out on October 28, 2002.

Track listing

Personnel
Devendra Banhart – guitar (acoustic, electric), vocals, piano, drums, producer
Doug Henderson – producer
Michael Gira – cover design
Doug Henderson – mastering
Rodney Miller – layout design

Additional information
A few songs on here also appear on The Charles C. Leary, and they are apparently the same recordings of them. The Charles C. Leary appears in the same form, while "Mmplushumblehorse" has been renamed "Nice People." Miss Cain references Sarah Cain, a woman Banhart was dating at the time.  "Gentle Soul" references one of his good friends in Paris who had just had a baby, and named her Camilah.

References

2002 albums
Devendra Banhart albums
Young God Records albums
Albums produced by Doug Henderson (musician)